The 1992–93 Gamma Ethniki was the tenth season since the official establishment of the third tier of Greek football in 1983. Kallithea and Anagennisi Karditsa were crowned champions in Southern and Northern Group respectively, thus winning promotion to Beta Ethniki. Kalamata and Veria also won promotion as a runners-up of the groups.

Ilisiakos, Kerkyra, Poseidon Heraklion, Sparti, Diagoras, Chalkida, Odysseas Kordelio, Anagennisi Chalkidona, Pontioi Kozani, Poseidon Nea Michaniona, Anagennisi Arta and Fokikos were relegated to Delta Ethniki.

Southern Group

League table

Northern Group

League table

References

Third level Greek football league seasons
3
Greece